Sukhdev Rajbhar (5 September 1951 – 18 October 2021) was an Indian politician and a member of 11th, 12th, 14th, 15th, and 17th Legislative Assembly, Uttar Pradesh of India. He represented the Didarganj constituency in Azamgarh district of Uttar Pradesh. He was a Speaker of the Legislative Assembly of Uttar Pradesh and a Minister in the Mayawati, Kalyan Singh and Mulayam Singh Yadav cabinets.

Political career
Sukhdev Rajbhar contested Uttar Pradesh Assembly election as Bahujan Samaj Party candidate and defeated his close contestant Adil Sheikh from Samajwadi Party with a margin of 3,645 votes.

Posts held

 1991–1993 Member, 11th Legislative Assembly of Uttar Pradesh (first term)
Member, Scheduled Castes, Scheduled Tribes and Denitrified Tribes related joint committee
1993–1994 Member, 12th Legislative Assembly of Uttar Pradesh (second term)
State Minister, Co-operatives, Muslim Waqf Department (Mulayam Singh Yadav Cabinet)
1994–1995 State Minister, Department of Secondary and Basic Education (Mulayam Singh Yadav ministry)
1995–1997 Minister, Secondary, Basic and Adult Education (Mayawati Cabinet)
1997–2002 Member, Uttar Pradesh Legislative Council
Minister for Rural Development, Ambedkar Village Development and the Provincial Department of Defense Party (Mayawati Cabinet)
Minister for Rural Development, Minor Irrigation Department (MKalyan Singh Cabinet)
2002–2007 Member, 14th Legislative Assembly of Uttar Pradesh (third term)
Minister of Parliamentary Affairs, textiles and silk Industry Department (Mayawati Cabinet)
Member, Committee on Rules
Member, Working – Advisory Committee
2007–2012 Member, 15th Legislative Assembly of Uttar Pradesh (fourth term)
Speaker, Legislative Assembly of Uttar Pradesh
2017-Incumbent Member, 17th Legislative Assembly of Uttar Pradesh (fifth term)

See also
Uttar Pradesh Legislative Assembly

References

1951 births
2021 deaths
Uttar Pradesh MLAs 2017–2022
Bahujan Samaj Party politicians
People from Azamgarh district
Samajwadi Party politicians from Uttar Pradesh